Shanuka Dulaj (born 4 March 1995) is a Sri Lankan cricketer. He made his first-class debut for Moors Sports Club in the 2014–15 Premier Trophy on 23 January 2015.

References

External links
 

1995 births
Living people
Sri Lankan cricketers
Moors Sports Club cricketers
Cricketers from Colombo
Alumni of Prince of Wales' College, Moratuwa